Crippled Avengers is a 1978 Shaw Brothers kung fu film directed by Chang Cheh and starring four members of the Venom Mob. It has been released in North America as Mortal Combat and The Return of the 5 Deadly Venoms. The film follows a group of four martial artists seeking revenge after being crippled by Chu Twin (Chen Kuan Tai), a martial arts master, and his son, Chu Cho Chang (Lu Feng).

Plot 
Chu Twin, a master of Tiger-style kung fu, returns home to find his wife murdered and his son crippled, having his arms cut off from the elbows down. Chu Twin has iron arms constructed for his son and trains him in the art of kung fu. Despite getting revenge on the wrongdoers, they are still filled with bitterness and anger toward the world. During Chu Twin's reign over his village, he and his son cripple four men who defy them.

The town blacksmith, Mr. Wei, becomes annoyed and verbally abusive toward Chu Twin when he and his entourage occupy the upstairs portion of a tavern when he wants to use it. He is forced to drink a liquid to make him mute and, when he remains defiant, is deafened by a two-handed ear clap delivered by Chu Twin himself. After Mr. Wei is forced to leave the tavern, a traveling hawker is blinded by the iron fingers of Chu Twin's son, Chu Cho Chang, for supporting the same sentiments as Wei. Another person has his legs chopped off below the knee at the orders of Chu Twin for bumping into his son.

One day, a young kung fu master known as Yuan Yi comes to town. When he discovers the tortures committed by Chu Twin, he vows to avenge the three crippled men. Yuan Yi is good but he is young and no match for Chu Twin, Chu Cho Chang, and his enforcer, Mr. Wan. Yuan Yi is defeated and bound in chains. Chu Twin turns him into an idiot by crushing his head in an iron vise.

Together, the now four disabled men travel to Yuan Yi's master's temple, where they are trained in kung fu. Each heightens his remaining senses to compensate for his disability. Mr. Wei, deaf and mute, learns sign language to communicate and wears reflective bands so that he can see what he cannot hear. The hawker's ears become sensitive, able to hear the falling of leaf and hit it with a dart. Mr. Wei outfits the legless man with prosthetic iron legs and feet. Yuan Yi, still a kung fu master, needs no further training but constantly laughs and acts as if he were playing a child's game while fighting. The four men make plans to return to town on Chu Twin's 45th birthday and exact their revenge. Mr. Wan hires other kung fu masters to stop the vengeance-minded men. The other masters, though very strong, underestimate the four and end up defeated.

In the final fight, the four misfit masters defeat Mr. Wan, Chu Twin, and Chu Cho Chang. However, Yuan Yi is killed sacrificing himself for the blind master, all the while giddily laughing like a child.

Reception 
Ian Jane of DVD Talk rated it 4.5/5 stars and wrote, "With heroes you can cheer for and bad guys evil enough to hiss at, The Return Of The 5 Deadly Venoms is top tier old school martial arts mayhem at its best."  Bill Palmer, Karen Palmer, and Richard Meyers wrote in The Martial Arts Encyclopedia, "The story is somewhat unusual, and there are plenty of excellently choreographed fight scenes."

References

External links 
 
 

1978 films
1978 martial arts films
1978 action films
Hong Kong martial arts films
Shaw Brothers Studio films
Kung fu films
Films directed by Chang Cheh
1970s Hong Kong films